Tom Siebenaler (born 28 September 1990) is a Luxembourger international footballer who plays club football for FC UNA Strassen, as a defender.

References

External links

1990 births
Living people
Luxembourgian footballers
CS Grevenmacher players
FC Differdange 03 players
Luxembourg National Division players
Luxembourg international footballers
Association football defenders
Luxembourg under-21 international footballers
Luxembourg youth international footballers
FC UNA Strassen players